Prairie Township is a township in Jewell County, Kansas, USA.  As of the 2000 census, its population was 172.

Geography
Prairie Township covers an area of 37.05 square miles (95.95 square kilometers); of this, 0.01 square miles (0.01 square kilometers) or 0.01 percent is water. The streams of Dry Creek, Dry Creek, East Buffalo Creek, Spring Creek and West Buffalo Creek run through this township.

Cities and towns
 Randall

Adjacent townships
 Buffalo Township (north)
 Vicksburg Township (northeast)
 Allen Township (east)
 Plum Creek Township, Mitchell County (south)
 Solomon Rapids Township, Mitchell County (southwest)
 Browns Creek Township (west)

Cemeteries
The township contains two cemeteries: Pleasant Prairie and Star.

Major highways
 K-14
 K-28

References
 U.S. Board on Geographic Names (GNIS)
 United States Census Bureau cartographic boundary files

External links
 US-Counties.com
 City-Data.com

Townships in Jewell County, Kansas
Townships in Kansas